The 2020–21 season was AaB's 38th consecutive season in the top flight of Danish football, 31st consecutive season in the Danish Superliga, and 135th year in existence as a football club.

Club

Coaching staff 

{| class="wikitable"
!Position
!Staff
|-
|Head coach|| Jacob Friis (until 29 October 2020, resigned) Peter Feher (interim, from 29 October 2020 to 31 January 2021) Martí Cifuentes (from 1 January 2021)
|-
|Assistant coaches|| Peter Feher Rasmus Würtz
|-
|Head of football|| Søren Krogh
|-
|Goalkeeping coach|| Poul Buus
|-
|Analyst|| Jim Holm Larsen
|-
|Team Leader|| Ernst Damborg
|-
|Doctor|| Søren Kaalund
|-
|Physiotherapist|| Morten Skjoldager
|-
|Physical trainer|| Ashley Tootle
|-
|U/19 League coach||  Kim Leth Andersen
|-
|U/17 League coach|| Nikolaj Hørby
|-
|U/15 League coach|| Theis Larsen
|-
|U/14 League coach|| Jonas Westmark
|-
|U/13 League coach|| Philip Nødgaard
|-

Other information 

|-

Squad

First team squad 

This squad list includes any first team squad player who has been available for the line-up during the season.

Source: AaB Fodbold website

Youth players in use 

This list includes any youth player from AaB Academy who has been used in the season.

Transfers and loans

In

Summer

Winter

Out

Summer

Winter

Loan in 

Note 1: In the initial agreement between AaB and Stade de Reims, the loan of Timothé Nkada was to run until 30 June 2021. However, AaB chose to return Nkada in the beginning of May 2021, as the player frequently was left out of the squad.

Loan out 

Note 2: In the initial agreement between AaB and FK Haugesund, the loan of Oliver Klitten was to run until 31 December 2021, with AaB being able to bring home the player in any intermediate transfer window. AaB activated this clause on 4 January 2021.

Friendlies

Pre-season

Mid-season

Competitions

Competition record

Superliga

Results summary

Regular season

Matches

Qualification round

Matches

Superliga European play-off

Danish Cup

Note 1: The match was moved away from B.93's normal ground, Østerbro Stadion, by authorities in Copenhagen Municipality.

Statistics

Appearances 

This includes all competitive matches. The list is sorted by shirt number when appearances are equal.

Goalscorers 

This includes all competitive matches. The list is sorted by shirt number when total goals are equal.

Assists 

This includes all competitive matches. The list is sorted by shirt number when total assists are equal.

Clean sheets 

This includes all competitive matches. The list is sorted by shirt number when total clean sheets are equal.

Disciplinary record 

This includes all competitive matches. The list is sorted by shirt number when total cards are equal.

Suspensions 

This includes all competitive matches. The list is sorted by shirt number when total matches suspended are equal.

Awards

Team

Individual

References

2020-21
Danish football clubs 2020–21 season